Arkansas is a state in the Southern United States. According to the 2020 United States census, it is the 33rd most populous state with  inhabitants and the 27th largest by land area spanning  of land.
Arkansas is divided into 75 counties and contains 501 municipalities consisting of cities and towns as of the 2020 United States census.

Arkansas municipalities are divided into three categories based on population. Usually, cities of the first class have a population over 2,500, cities of the second class have between 500 and 2,499 people, and incorporated towns have 499 or fewer people; state law, however, provides mechanisms for a municipality to increase or decrease its classification despite not meeting the usual population requirement. There are differences in responsibilities between classes of Arkansas municipalities with incorporated towns generally having fewer municipal responsibilities.

The largest municipality by population is the state capital of Little Rock with 202,591 residents while the smallest by population is Victoria with 20 residents.

Classification of municipalities
Arkansas municipalities are divided into three categories based on population according to the laws in the 2020 Arkansas Code Title 14. The state does not use villages or civil townships as possible designations for its minor civil divisions.

City (first class)
Cities of the first class have a population over 2,500 and elect two council members per ward (elected at-large or by ward, or both). Any municipal expense over $20,000 goes to bidding by default in cities of the first class only. Only cities of the first class must hold elections for vacant mayoralty lasting more than one year, and must elect a city attorney to a four-year term. Cities of the first class must have a city clerk and may have a treasurer elected for a four-year term (or the role combined with city clerk). Cities of the first class must create a planning commission with at least five members and may have a police department superintended by a mayor. There are retirement benefits available if certain conditions are met for mayors and city clerks or treasurers.

City (second class)
Cities of the second class have a population between 500 and 2,499 people and elect two council members per ward (elected at-large or by ward, or both). A city of the second class must have a recorder and may have a treasurer elected for a four-year term (or the role combined with city clerk). Cities of the second class do not need to create a separate planning commission and may allow city councilors to serve as the planning commission. Cities of the second class may have a police department, a marshal or a department of public safety. There are retirement benefits available if certain conditions are met for mayors and city clerks or treasurers.

Town
Towns have a population of 499 or fewer people and elect five council members at-large with no wards. Towns must have a treasurer-recorder as a single position. Towns may have a police department, a marshal or a department of public safety. No prescribed retirement benefits are available for mayors and clerks or treasurers of towns.

List of municipalities

Notes

See also

List of Arkansas townships
List of counties in Arkansas

References

Cities

Arkansas
Arkansas